Better Ways to Die is the fourth studio album by Boston hardcore punk band Death Before Dishonor. It was released in 2009 on Bridge 9 Records.

Track list

References

2009 albums
Death Before Dishonor (band) albums
Bridge 9 Records albums